Asternolaelaps is a genus of mites in the family Ichthyostomatogasteridae. There is at least one described species in Asternolaelaps, A. fecundus.

References

Mesostigmata
Articles created by Qbugbot